Udo Beyer (born 9 August 1955) is a former East German track and field athlete who competed in the shot put. Beyer has admitted to knowingly taking part in doping while he competed for East Germany. He was a Stasi informer under the codename "Kapitän".

Biography
Beyer is the oldest of the six children of heating mechanic Hans-Georg Beyer and his wife Eva-Marie and was born in Stalinstadt, today Eisenhüttenstadt. He grew up in Breslack, (today the municipality of Neißemünde), and in Eisenhüttenstadt.  Like all of his siblings, he played handball at the local sport club. He was a member of the team representing the district in Frankfurt where he became a successful goalkeeper.  On the advice of his father he decided to pursue a sporting career, concentrating on athletics.  After the youth tournament in 1969, he changed to the youth sports school in Frankfurt (Oder), where he earned his Abitur.  At the same time he became a member of ASK Vorwärts Frankfurt.

In 1970 Ernst Kühl became his trainer, himself a successful shot putter and discus thrower for East Germany.  Kühl had taken part in the 1960 and 1964 unified German team at the Summer Olympic games.  In 1973 Beyer changed clubs as well as coaches moving to ASK Vorwärts Potsdam under Lothar Hillebrand.  In Potsdam he concentrated solely on the shot put and began also studying at the University to become a physical education teacher.  As a member of the Army sports club (ASK) Beyer was also a sports officer of the NVA and had also become Hauptmann (Captain) in the Bundeswehr. His sport career was essentially over after the 1988 Summer Olympic games, but his wife was able to convince him in 1990 to continue until 1992.

For many years, Beyer was captain of the East German athletics national team.

At a height of 1.94 meters, he weighed 130 kilograms.  Even for a shot putter, Beyer was exceptionally strong.

At the end of his sport career, Beyer started work as a travel agent and has owned a travel agency in Potsdam since 1996.  He lives in Potsdam and has been married since 1976 and has had two daughters, one of whom died as a child.

All of his siblings were very active in sports.  At the Summer Olympics of 1980 in Moscow, Udo was with his sister Gisela Beyer and his brother Hans-Georg Beyer.  All three reached their respective final rounds: Hans-Georg was Olympic champion with his handball team, Udo was third in the shot put and Gisela was fourth in the discus.  His sister Gudrun was also with him at the 1992 Summer Olympics in Barcelona, as a physical therapist.

Since 2004 Beyer is also the "Chocolate Ambassador" for Germany's oldest chocolate factory, Halloren of Halle (Saale).  He is also very active as an official representative for the "children's hospice of middle Germany" for terminally ill children and their families.

Beyer has admitted to knowingly taking part in doping while he competed for East Germany – which had a systematic doping program for its top athletes in the 1970s. His admission came in the documentary film The Lone Wolf, which was first shown in the 2013 Berlin Film Festival.

Results 
Together with his longtime East German teammate Ulf Timmermann, he dominated ten years of competitions in his discipline.

Olympic Games
 1976 – Olympic Champion
 1980 – Bronze medal
 1984 – did not participate due to boycott
 1988 – Fourth place
 1992 – eliminated during qualification

Records
World records:
 6 August 1978: 22.15 m
 25 July 1983: 22.22 m
 20 April 1986: 22.64 m

Junior-European records:
6.25 kg-shot (Junior-shot)
 13 July 1973: 21.03 m
7,26 kg-shot (Men's-shot)
 7 July 1973: 19.63 m
 6 July 1974: 20.20 m
 21 June 1975: 20.97 m (Current Record)

European-Championships
 1973 – Junior-European champion
 1974 – 8th place
 1978 – European champion
 1982 – European champion
 1986 – Bronze medal
 1974 – 6th place

IAAF-World cup, Shot put
 1977, 1979 and 1981 – Winner

European cup, shot put
 1977, 1979 and 1981 – Winner
 1985 – 3rd place

East German-Championships
 1974 – 2nd place
 1977–1987 – GDR-champion (11 consecutive times)
 1988 – 2nd place
 1990 – 3rd place
 1980 – GDR-Indoor champion

Children- and Youth Spartakiade
 1972 – Spartakiade winner

Honors 
 1978 – GDR Sportsman of the year
 2 times patriotic earnings/service medal in Silver
 7 times Champion of Sport

References

European Championships

1955 births
Living people
Sportspeople from Eisenhüttenstadt
People from Bezirk Frankfurt
German male shot putters
East German male shot putters
Olympic athletes of East Germany
Olympic athletes of Germany
Olympic gold medalists for East Germany
Olympic bronze medalists for East Germany
Athletes (track and field) at the 1976 Summer Olympics
Athletes (track and field) at the 1980 Summer Olympics
Athletes (track and field) at the 1988 Summer Olympics
Athletes (track and field) at the 1992 Summer Olympics
Medalists at the 1976 Summer Olympics
Medalists at the 1980 Summer Olympics
World Athletics Championships athletes for East Germany
European Athletics Championships medalists
World record setters in athletics (track and field)
National People's Army military athletes
Doping cases in athletics
German sportspeople in doping cases
Olympic gold medalists in athletics (track and field)
Olympic bronze medalists in athletics (track and field)
Universiade medalists in athletics (track and field)
Recipients of the Patriotic Order of Merit in silver
People of the Stasi
Universiade gold medalists for East Germany
World Athletics Indoor Championships medalists
Medalists at the 1979 Summer Universiade
Friendship Games medalists in athletics